China Rising may refer to:
 a downloadable content (DLC) pack for the video game Battlefield 4
 China Rising, a documentary with four episodes